The 1957 Virginia Cavaliers football team represented the University of Virginia during the 1957 NCAA University Division football season. The Cavaliers were led by second-year head coach Ben Martin and played their home games at Scott Stadium in Charlottesville, Virginia. They competed as members of the Atlantic Coast Conference, finishing in sixth. At the conclusion of the season, Martin resigned as head coach to accept the head coaching position at the United States Air Force Academy.

Schedule

References

Virginia
Virginia Cavaliers football seasons
Virginia Cavaliers football